"Slipping Through My Fingers" is a song written by Björn Ulvaeus and Benny Andersson and recorded by Swedish pop group ABBA from their 1981 album The Visitors, with lead vocals by Agnetha Fältskog. The song is about a mother's regret at how quickly her daughter is growing up, and the lack of time they have spent together, as the girl goes to school.

The inspiration for the song was Ulvaeus' and Fältskog's daughter, Linda Ulvaeus, who was seven at the time the song was written.

The song was only released as a single in Japan, where it was a red vinyl promo single for The Coca-Cola Company with nothing on the B-side except a printed picture of the group. An album with the same name and a similar-looking cover was also released in Japan.

Certifications

Spanish version
"Se Me Está Escapando" is the Spanish Language version of "Slipping Through My Fingers", with lyrics by Buddy and Mary McCluskey. The song was released as a single in Spanish-speaking countries in 1982 and also included on the South American versions of the album The Visitors. The track was first released on CD in 1994 as part of the Polydor US compilation Más ABBA Oro, and in 1999 included on the expanded re-release of ABBA Oro: Grandes Éxitos.

Cover versions
 The song is used in the ABBA songs-based musical Mamma Mia!, as well as the 2008 movie adaptation. This version was certified Silver by BPI in 2021.
 American stage musical singer Wendy Coates recorded a cover of the song for her 2001 album Journeys.

References

External links
abba4therecord.com

1981 singles
ABBA songs
Songs about mothers
Songs about nostalgia
Songs about parenthood
Songs about school
Songs written by Benny Andersson and Björn Ulvaeus